"What Do You Care" is a song recorded by Canadian country music artist Patricia Conroy. It was released in 1993 as the third single from her second studio album, Bad Day for Trains. It peaked at number 8 on the RPM Country Tracks chart in March 1993.

Chart performance

References

1992 songs
1993 singles
Patricia Conroy songs
Warner Music Group singles